The Martyr of Kufa original title Imam Ali is an Iranian epic television series focusing on the life of Ali ibn Abi Talib, directed by Davood Mirbagheri, and originally broadcast in 1992 in 22 episodes. It was subsequently released on DVD, with other editions including one with English sub-titles, and one dubbed into Urdu. The series covers the events before the caliphate of Ali ibn Abi Talib to his assassination in Kufa, Iraq. The telefilm version of this series has also been made and broadcast.

Story 
The story of this series starts from the end of the caliphate of Uthman ibn Affan and covers the last five years and the period of the caliphate and the life and martyrdom of Ali ibn Abi Talib.This series also shows the events of the caliphate of Ali bin Abi Talib. Its events include the Battle of Jamel, the Battle of Safin and the Battle of Nahrvan. This collection also includes other events such as the Qur'an on a spear in the Battle of Safin, the suppression of oath-breakers in the Battle of Jamal, the dispute between Ali Ibn Abi Talib and Abu Musa Ash'ari and the emergence of the Khawarij, the suppression of the Khawarij in the Battle of Nahrwan and the death of Malik Ashtar and Ammar Ibn Yasir also shows.

Cast
 Dariush Arjmand as Malik al-Ashtar
 Vishka Asayesh as Quttam
 Mohammad-Reza Sharifinia as Waleed ibn Uqba
 Mehdi Fat'hi as 'Amr ibn al-'As
 Jamshid Mashayekhi as Abdullah ibn Mas'ud
 Parviz Parastui as Muhammad ibn Abi Bakr
 Jahangir Forouhar as Abu Sufyan ibn Harb
 Behzad Farahani as Muawiyah I
 Farhad Aslani as Yazid I
 Davoud Rashidi as Hakim ibn Jablah
 Hossein Panahi as Son of Khabbab
 Nematollah Gorji as an old man
 Azita Hajian as a Roman Slave girl
 Akbar Abdi as Romi
 Ahmad Ghadakchian as Businessman
 Anoushirvan Arjmand as Asha's ibn Qays
 Abbas Amiri Moghaddam as Abu Musa Ashaari
 Sirous Gorjestani as Aba Quttam
 Saeed Nikpour as Ammar ibn Yasir
 Enayat Bakhshi as Abdullah ibn Wahab al-Rasbi
 Asghar Hemmat as Marwan I
 Parvaneh Masoumi as Hagar
 Bagher Sahraroodi as Ka'ab al-Ahbar
 Karim Akbari Mobarakeh as Abd-al-Rahman ibn Muljam
 Mansour Vala Magham as Zubayr ibn al-Awwam
 Javad Khodadadi as Abu Dhar al-Ghifari
 Shohreh Lorestani as Maryam Bint Osman
 Siavash Shakeri  as Abu Zeyd
 Manochehr Larijani as Talhah
 Fakhri Khorvash as Nannies Walid
 Ali Azad as Abd Allah ibn Abbas
 Farideh Sepah Mansour as Om zar
 Touran Mehrzad as Asma
 Morteza Zarrabi as Jewish sorcerer
 Hossein Khanibeik as Dinar
 Aziz Honar Amooz as Aqeel ibn Abi Talib
 Soroush Khalili as Courier
 Atash Taghipour as Saadoun
 Reza Khandan as Adi ibn Hatim
 Fakhreddin Seddigh Sharif as Ben addis
 Akbar Sangi as Abd Allah ibn al-Zubayr
 Sarvar Nejat Allahi as Walid wife
 Rahman Baghrian Uthman ibn Hunaif
 Ali Asghar Garmsiri as Rags
 Ali Zandi as Sa`d ibn Abi Waqqas
 Nader Rajabpour as Ibn amer
 Changiz Vossoughi as Werdan bin Mojaled
 Enayatollah Shafei as Jondab-e-asadi
Faghiheh Soltani

Music
The music for the series was composed by Farhad Fakhreddini and involved a choir and the singer Sediq Tarif. Consisting of 17 tracks, the music was subsequently released on the Soroush label.

Track listing

Footnotes

See also

 Loneliest Leader
 List of Islamic films

References
 Article about the making of Shaheed-e-Kufa 
 Shaheed-e-Kufa at the Internet Archive

External links
 

Iranian television series
Television series about Islam
2000s Iranian television series
2000 Iranian television series debuts
Works about Ali